D5 or D05 may refer to:

Arts and fiction 
 Dedication 5, a 2013 mixtape by American rapper Lil Wayne
 D5 class Klingon starships, in the Star Trek science fiction series
 Dimension Delete and Deadly Destruction Day, featured in Digimon Xros Wars

Other uses 
 Digital 5, a network of leading digital governments
 D5 HD, a professional digital video format
 Demand 5, a video on demand website
 The fifth D: All Things Digital, conference
 Nikon D5, a 20.9 megapixel DSLR camera
 Trident D5 ballistic missile
 Volvo D5 engine, an engine family made by Volvo Cars

Transport, aviation and logistics 
 Citroën D5
 Albatros D.V, a German World War I fighter plane
 Identification symbol for Nachtjagdgeschwader 3, a Luftwaffe night fighter-wing of World War II
 Dauair (IATA code D5)
 Dublin 5, an Irish postal district
 Land Rover D5 - Discovery 5

Roads 
 D5 motorway (Czech Republic)
 D5 road (Croatia), a state road
 Detour for the M5 South Western Motorway, Sydney, Australia

Substances 
 Vitamin D5
 D5, also known as DRD5, a subtype of dopamine receptors
 A 5% dextrose solution, a type of intravenous fluid
 Decamethylcyclopentasiloxane, an organosilicon compound
 ATC code D05, Antipsoriatics, a subgroup of the Anatomical Therapeutic Chemical Classification System
D5, slang for a 5-milligram diazepam tablet

See also 
 DV (disambiguation)